= Fouad Kamal Hussein =

Egyptian economist (1923–2006)

Fouad Kamal Hussein (October 7, 1923 – February 11, 2006), also known as Fouad Hussein, was an Egyptian economist. He served as the 25th Finance Minister of Egypt from December 1980 to December 1981.

== Education ==
Fouad Hussein received a Bachelor of Science in Agricultural Sciences from Cairo University in 1944 and a post-graduate degree in Economics from Oxford University in 1950.

== Early career ==
Fouad Hussein served as an economic advisor to the United Nations Technical Assistance Program in New York City from 1954 to 1968. Between 1954 and 1956, he served as an economic advisor to Jordan, Kuwait, Yemen, Lebanon, and a few other Asian and Middle Eastern countries. In India, he served as the Chief Economic Advisor to the Government of India under Prime Minister Jawaharlal Nehru from 1956 to 1959. He served in various assignments for the UNTAA, both at United Nations' headquarters in New York and in the field.

He served in the Government of Egypt from 1959 to 1962 as the senior economist for the National Planning Commission, participating in the preparation and coordination of Egypt's first Five-Year Economic and Social Plans. From 1960, he served as Secretary General to the Government, coordinating functions between Egypt's Presidential Cabinet, Parliament, and various government agencies.

== International Monetary Fund ==
From December 1970 to November 1976, he served 3 terms as alternate executive director to Nazeeh Ahmed Dhaif, who was executive director at the time. He participated in executive board deliberations and in the review and the reform of the International Monetary System. During this period, he represented Egypt and 14 other Middle Eastern countries. In the course of his terms, he provided technical cooperation and promoted matters of mutual interest between the IMF and these countries.

== Ministry of Economy ==
On his return to Egypt from his IMF assignment, he was appointed as Deputy Minister of Economy and Foreign Trade. During this period from 1977 to 1979, he oversaw monetary matters and international economic relations.

== Capital Market Authority ==
In 1979, he became founder and chairman of the board. He served in this position until 1980. The authority was responsible for promoting Egypt's capital and money markets, revitalizing the private sector, and regulating Egypt's corporate and securities exchange activities.

== Ministry of Finance ==
In the latter part of 1980, he was appointed as Minister of State for Finance, in then President Anwar El Sadat's cabinet. During his 12-month appointment, he oversaw all fiscal affairs for the Government of Egypt, including budget preparation, government accounting, regulatory functions, and taxation.

== Egypt Investment Finance Corporation ==
In 1982, he became the founder and chairman of the board. This was Egypt's first investment securities firm. It had a capital of LE 100 million, providing a wide range of financial services in Egypt and other countries. He continued in this role until 1986.

== Arab International Bank ==
Also in 1982, he became an economic advisor to the AIB, serving as chief consultant to the board of directors of the bank, which was sponsored by five Arab nations. He had oversight of the Department of Economic and Financial Research. He served as editor-in-chief of the bank's quarterly and monthly economic reviews. His contract with the bank was renewed annually. Every year, before the renewal, he would comment that the bank would probably not renew his contract. The bank continued to renew his contract every year, until 2006, when he submitted his final resignation effective the first of March, the date of the annual renewal. However, he died before his resignation went into effect on the eleventh of February.
